Sir Andrew James McMichael,  (born 8 November 1943) is an immunologist, Professor of Molecular Medicine, and previously Director of the Weatherall Institute of Molecular Medicine at the University of Oxford. He is particularly known for his work on T cell responses to viral infections such as influenza and HIV.

Early life and education 
McMichael was born in London on 8 November 1943 to Sir John McMichael and Joan Catherine. He went to school at St Pauls and then to the University of Cambridge at Gonville and Caius College to study medicine (1962–1968). He went on to complete a PhD at the National Institute for Medical Research supervised by 'Ita' Brigitte Askonas and Alan Williamson. His thesis, published in 1975, is entitled The clonal expression of antibody-forming cells.

Career and research 
After his PhD McMichael completed his postdoctoral research supervised by Hugh McDevitt at Stanford University. In 1977 he returned to the UK to study the T cell response to HIV infection. His research group have created two HIV vaccines which were tested in phase I clinical trials. McMichael became director of the Weatherall Institute of Molecular Medicine in 2000, and remained so until 2012. He founded the MRC Human Immunology Unit in 1998 as honorary director until 2010.

McMichael has supervised over 55 DPhil students over his career, many of whom have gone on to become leading immunologists themselves: 
 Douglas F. Nixon, Professor of Immunology in Medicine, Weill Cornell Medical College.
 Malegapuru Makgoba, Professor of Immunology and former Vice-Chancellor & Principal of the University of KwaZulu-Natal. 
 Matilu Mwau Professor and Executive Director of the Consortium for National Health Research 
 Paul Bowness, Professor of Experimental Rheymatology 
 Awen Gallimore, Professor of Cancer Immunology 
 Paul Klenerman, Sidney Truelove Professor of Gastroenterology 
 Dan Barouch, Professor of Medicine and Director of the Center for Virology and Vaccine Research at Harvard Medical School 
 Sophie Hambleton, Professor of Paediatrics & Immunology 
 Suranjith Seneviratne, Professor, Director of the Centre for Mast Cell Disorders and the President of the UK-Sri Lanka Immunology Foundation. 
 Ling-Pei Ho, Professor of Respiratory Immunology 
In addition McMichael supervised postdoctoral researchers, including Tomáš Hanke (Professor of Vaccine Immunology), and Sarah Rowland-Jones (Professor of Immunology).

Awards and honours 
 Fellow of the Royal Society (1992)
 Member of the European Molecular Biology Organisation (2004)
 Novartis Prize for Basic Immunology (1998)
 Rose Payne Distinguished Scientist award (1998)
 Fellow of the Academy of Medical Sciences (1998)
 Sheikh Hamdan Award (2000)
 Ambuj Nath Bose Prize, Royal College of Physicians (2001)
 Ernst Chain Prize (2006)
 Nature/NESTA Award for Lifetime Mentoring (2006)
 Knighthood for services to medical science (2008)

Personal life 
In 1968 McMichael married Kathryn 'Kate' Elizabeth Cross, they have two sons and one daughter. McMichael enjoys walking and skiing at his house in La Salle les Alpes, France.

Notable works

References 

1943 births
Living people
Fellows of the Royal Society
Knights Bachelor
People educated at St Paul's School, London
Alumni of Gonville and Caius College, Cambridge